Nissim Cohen is a former Israeli footballer who is most notable for playing in the Israeli Premier League until he was 44 years old.

Honours
Israeli Second Division:
1992-93, 1997-98
Toto Cup:
1996-97

References

1955 births
Israeli Jews
Living people
Israeli footballers
Maccabi Herzliya F.C. players
Maccabi Petah Tikva F.C. players
Beitar Tel Aviv F.C. players
Maccabi Jaffa F.C. players
Bnei Yehuda Tel Aviv F.C. players
Hapoel Ashkelon F.C. players
Maccabi Ramat Amidar F.C. players
Footballers from Herzliya
Liga Leumit players
Association football midfielders
Israel international footballers